Team Downey is an American film production company founded by Robert Downey Jr. and Susan Downey that produces films using television properties. David Gambino is the president of production. Team Downey was based at Warner Bros. since its founding in 2010, but left in October 2016, when the company received a first look deal with Sonar Entertainment. However, it will still be part of Warner Bros' "top priority projects" such as a live-action adaptation of Pinocchio, and an expanded media franchise shared universe based on Guy Ritchie's Sherlock Holmes (2009) and Sherlock Holmes: A Game of Shadows (2011), in which Downey had starred with Jude Law, consisting of a third feature film and two HBO Max streaming television series as of April 2022.

Filmography

Film

Television

References

External links
 Official Website

Film production companies of the United States
Television production companies of the United States
Companies based in Los Angeles
Privately held companies of the United States